Monica Jacobs Birwinyo (born 4 June 1990) is a Ugandan actress and Television personality. She began her career as an actress starting off with uncredited roles and moving on to recurring roles on Imbabazi, The Pardon and Irene Kulabako's Beauty to Ashes and the NBS hit series Because of U. 5@home, the Honorablez, Mela and Zansanze a stage play

Career 
In March 2012, Monica Birwinyo, Irene Asumpta and Jacob Nsaali were confirmed as the co-hosts of the first season of the Movie Digest Show. She is currently co-presenting the second season with Usama Mukwaya. Monica has recently featured in Joel Karekezi's Imbabazi, The Pardon, as Muhoza.

References

External links
 
 Official Twitter

1990 births
Living people
Ugandan television actresses
Ugandan television personalities
Ugandan film actresses
Place of birth missing (living people)
21st-century Ugandan actresses
Ugandan television presenters
Ugandan women television presenters